The 2016–17 Missouri State Lady Bears basketball team represented Missouri State University during the 2016–17 NCAA Division I women's basketball season. The Lady Bears, led by fourth year head coach Kellie Harper, played their home games at JQH Arena and were members of the Missouri Valley Conference. They finished the season 16–15, 12–4 in MVC play to finish in third place. They lost in the semifinals of the Missouri Valley Tournament to Evansville. They received an automatic bid to the Women's National Invitation Tournament where they lost to Iowa in the first round.

Roster

Schedule

|-
! colspan="9" style="background:maroon; color:#fff;"| Exhibition

|-
! colspan="9" style="background:maroon; color:#fff;"| Non-conference regular season

|-
! colspan="9" style="background:maroon; color:#fff;"| Missouri Valley regular season

|-
! colspan="9" style="background:maroon; color:#fff;"| Missouri Valley Women's Tournament

|-
! colspan="9" style="background:maroon; color:#fff;"| WNIT

See also
2016–17 Missouri State Bears basketball team

References

Missouri State Lady Bears basketball seasons
Missouri State
2017 Women's National Invitation Tournament participants
2016 in sports in Missouri
2017 in sports in Missouri